The mass media in Singapore refers to mass communication methods through broadcasting, publishing, and the Internet available in the city-state. Singapore's media environment is dominated by two major players, Mediacorp and SPH Media Trust. 

Comprising the publishing, print, broadcasting, film, music, digital, and IT media sectors, the media industry collectively employed about 38,000 people and contributed 1.56% to Singapore's gross domestic product (GDP) in 2001 with an annual turnover of S$10 billion. The industry grew at an average rate of 7.7% annually from 1990 to 2000, and the government seeks to increase its GDP contribution to 3% by 2012.

Regulation

The Ministry of Communications and Information is the government's regulatory body that imposes and enforces regulation over locally produced media content. It also decides on the availability of published media from abroad. Political, regulatory and structural control over all media forms restricts and discourages criticism of the government. Issues deemed to be inciting racial and religious hatred are prohibited, and media advocating non-traditional family units and lifestyles are avoided.

Most of the local media are directly or indirectly controlled by the government through shareholdings of these media entities by the state's investment arm Temasek Holdings, and are often perceived as pro-government. In 2021, Reporters Without Borders ranked Singapore 158 out of 180 countries in the Press Freedom Index.

In 2011, 56% of 1,092 local respondents to a telephone poll agreed that "there is too much government control of newspapers and television", and 48% felt that "newspapers and television are biased when they report on Singapore politics, political parties and elections".

Radio and television broadcasting

After it acquired the assets of SPH MediaWorks in 2004, the state-owned broadcaster Mediacorp currently owns and operates all six free-to-air terrestrial local television channels licensed to broadcast in Singapore, as well as 12 radio channels. The majority of radio stations in Singapore are mainly operated by Mediacorp with the exception of seven stations, which are operated by So Drama! Entertainment (a part of the Singapore Armed Forces) and SPH Media Trust respectively. The only radio station in Singapore that is entirely outside government control is the BBC Far Eastern Relay station, which broadcasts the BBC World Service locally on 88.9 FM.

Private ownership of TV satellite dishes was previously forbidden.

Newspapers

The Newspaper and Printing Presses Act of 1974 states:

Section 10 of the same act gives the Minister the power to appoint the management shareholders of all newspaper companies and to control any transfers of such management shares. The same section specifies that a management share equals 200 ordinary shares for "any resolution relating to the appointment or dismissal of a director or any member of the staff of a newspaper company", and that the number of management shares must equal at least 1% of ordinary shares. This gives the management shareholders, and by proxy the government, a minimum 66% majority in any votes regarding staffing decisions.

The print media are largely controlled by SPH Media Trust, publisher of the flagship English-language daily, The Straits Times. SPH publishes all daily newspapers with the exception of TODAY, which is owned by Mediacorp, now a digital publication. In 2009, a United States diplomatic cable leaked by WikiLeaks quotes Chua Chin Hon, The Straits Times US bureau chief, saying that the paper's "editors have all been groomed as pro-government supporters and are careful to ensure that reporting of local events adheres closely to the official line", and that "the government exerts significant pressure on ST editors to ensure that published articles follow the government's line". As with worldwide trends, SPH readership and subscription numbers have stagnated since the early-2000s, as Singaporeans increasingly turned to online media for their news.

, there are 16 newspapers in active circulation. Daily newspapers are published in English, Chinese, Malay and Tamil.

Under a reciprocal agreement between Malaysia and Singapore, Malaysia's New Straits Times newspaper may not be sold in Singapore, and Singapore's The Straits Times may not be sold in Malaysia. This is largely due to the history between these two countries.

See also

 Cinema of Singapore
 Communications in Singapore
 Article 14 of the Constitution of Singapore

Notes

 
Singapore
Singapore